The Man Who Lost Himself is a lost 1920 American silent comedy-drama film directed by Clarence G. Badger and George D. Baker. It was produced by its star, stage actor William Faversham, and Lewis J. Selznick. The film is based on the 1918 novel of the same title by Henry De Vere Stacpoole. Faversham plays dual roles of an English nobleman and an American who looks just like him.

The novel was later adapted again for a 1941 remake of the same title starring Brian Aherne and Kay Francis.

Plot
As described in a film magazine, American Victor Jones (Faversham) finds himself penniless and stranded in London. He meets the Earl of Rochester (Faversham), and the similarity between the two is so noticeable that even friends mistake Jones for the Earl. The Earl is estranged from his wife (Hopper) and family, owes great sums of money, and is considered in a bad light by acquaintances. He gets Jones drunk and sends him to the Rochester mansion, and then commits suicide. Until Jones receives a note written by the Earl prior to his death, he does not perceive his position. After reading the note, Jones immediately begins to pose as the Earl, but later reveals this scheme. However, he has fallen in love with the Earl's widow and they decide to reside in the United States.

Cast
William Faversham as Victor Jones / Earl of Rochester
Hedda Hopper as Countess of Rochester
Violet Reed as Lady Plinlimon
Radcliffe Steele as Sir Patrick Spence
Claude Payton as Prince Maniloff
Mathilde Brundage as Rochester's Mother
Emily Fitzroy as Rochester's Aunt
Downing Clark as Rochester's Uncle

Reception
According to The New York Times reviewer, provided the viewer could accept that an American, with no prior knowledge of the Englishman's life, could pass for him, "Any one disposed to make the necessary assumptions may, and undoubtedly will, enjoy the photoplay, for the two leading rôles are played by William Faversham with unfailing pantomimic ability and sureness of characterization."

References

External links

1920 films
American silent feature films
Films based on works by Henry De Vere Stacpoole
Films directed by Clarence G. Badger
Films directed by George D. Baker
Films based on British novels
Films based on Irish novels
1920 comedy-drama films
1920s English-language films
American black-and-white films
Lost American films
Selznick Pictures films
1920 lost films
Films set in London
Lost comedy-drama films
1920s American films
Silent American comedy-drama films